The Fundamental Statute of the Kingdom of Albania was the constitution used in the Albanian Kingdom. It was introduced by King Victor Emmanuel III of Italy after the Italian invasion of Albania. It replaced the previous constitution of the same name. It was signed by Victor Emmanuel III on 3 June 1939 and then presented to Shefqet Vërlaci in Rome, and went into effect the following day.

The 1939 constitution proclaimed Victor Emmanuel III the King of Albania and made Albania a constitutional monarchy. It also created a "Supreme Fascist Corporation Council" to serve as the legislature of Albania, structured after Italy's Chamber of Fasces and Corporations.

The 1939 constitution was replaced on 15 March 1946, after Enver Hoxha promulgated a constitution for the newly formed People's Republic of Albania.

Parts
Preamble 
Chapter I - General Provisions
Chapter II - The King
Chapter III - The Government of the King
Chapter IV - Superior Corporate Fascist Council
Chapter V - Judicial Order 
Chapter VI - The Rights and Duties of Citizens

See also
List of constitutions of Albania

References

Legal history of Albania
Constitutions of Albania
Defunct constitutions
1939 in law
1939 in Albania
1939 documents
June 1939 events
1939 in politics